The 2017-18 Elite One Championship was the 83rd season of France's domestic rugby league competition and the 17th season known as the Elite One championship. It was won by SO Avignon who finished fourth in the regular season.

Ladder

Points win=3: draw=2: loss=1:

Playoffs

Grand Final

External links
 https://www.youtube.com/watch?v=T4Hc1Ra9kLk

Sources
 https://www.scorespro.com/rugby-league/france/elite-1/2017-2018/results/

Rugby league competitions in France